Cycloleucine is a non-proteinogenic amino acid. It could be classified as a cyclic derivate of norleucine, having two hydrogen atoms less. Leading structure is a cyclopentane-ring. The α-carbon atom is not a stereocenter.

Cycloleucine is a non-metabolisable amino acid and is a specific and reversible inhibitor of nucleic acid methylation, and as such is widely used in biochemical experiments.

In 2007, a research study performed on primary rat hepatocytes had shown that cycloleucine can lower S-Adenosyl_methionine (SAM) levels in control hepatocytes by inhibiting the conversion of 5'-methylthioadenosine to SAM through the methionine salvage pathway. Cycloleucine treatment in conjunction with higher levels of cytochrome P450 2E1 (CYP2E1) and lower SAM levels in pyrazole hepatocytes had shown an increased amount of cell apoptosis when compared to control hepatocytes.

In a 2015 study on the role of N6-methyladenosine (m6A) demethylation on adipogenesis, researchers treated porcine adipocytes with increasing concentrations of cycloleucine. The researchers measured mRNA concentration of m6A using the Dot Blot method, and the results showed that cycloleucine increased adipocyte growth by blocking methylation by inhibiting m6A levels relative to the control adipocytes.

Building on the findings on cycloleucine’s role in the inhibition of N6-methyladenosine activity a 2022 study showed that cycloleucine inhibits porcine oocyte and embryo development. Researchers cultured porcine oocytes and isolated cumulus cells from their cumulus cell complexes, after which the cells were cultured in vitro with cycloleucine in increasing concentrations. The samples were monitored under fluorescence microscopy, with the results showing positive relationship between cycloleucine concentration and decreased viability and survival rate for oocytes.

References 

Cyclic amino acids
Cyclopentanes